Sambo (possibly from Quechua for "knock-kneed" or "a person with one black and one indigenous parent") is a mountain in the Vilcanota mountain range in the Andes of Peru, about  high. It is situated in the Puno Region, Melgar Province, Nuñoa District. Sambo lies southwest of Hueco and Quellhuacota and northwest of Huillopuncho.

References

Mountains of Peru
Mountains of Puno Region